Waqar Mehboob (born November 15, 1991 in Peshawar) is a professional squash player who represented Pakistan. He reached a career-high world ranking of World No. 67 in November 2009.

References

External links
  (archive 3)
 

1991 births
Living people
Pakistani male squash players